Sir John Vincent Hurt  (22 January 1940 – 25 January 2017) was an English actor whose career spanned over five decades. Hurt was regarded as one of Britain's finest actors. Director David Lynch described him as "simply the greatest actor in the world". He possessed what was described as the "most distinctive voice in Britain". He received numerous awards including the BAFTA Outstanding British Contribution to Cinema Award in 2012 and was knighted by Queen Elizabeth II in 2015 for his services to drama.

He came to prominence playing Richard Rich in the film A Man for All Seasons (1966) and won the British Academy Television Award for Best Actor for The Naked Civil Servant (1975). He played Caligula in the BBC TV series I, Claudius (1976). Hurt earned Academy Award nominations for Best Supporting Actor for Midnight Express (1978), and Best Actor for The Elephant Man (1980). Other films include Alien (1979), Heaven's Gate (1980), Champions (1984), 1984 (1984), The Hit (1984), Scandal (1989), The Field (1990) and Rob Roy (1995).

Hurt gained further prominence portraying Mr. Ollivander in the Harry Potter film series (2001–11), and starring in the Hellboy films (2004 and 2008), V for Vendetta (2005), Indiana Jones and the Kingdom of the Crystal Skull (2008), Outlander (2008), and Snowpiercer (2013). He also acted in the acclaimed films Melancholia (2011), Tinker Tailor Soldier Spy (2011), Only Lovers Left Alive (2013), Hercules (2014), and Jackie (2016).

Hurt reprised his role as Quentin Crisp in An Englishman in New York (2009), which brought his seventh BAFTA nomination. He portrayed the War Doctor in the BBC TV series Doctor Who 50th anniversary special, "The Day of the Doctor", in 2013. He voiced roles in Watership Down (1978), The Lord of the Rings (1978), The Plague Dogs (1982), The Black Cauldron (1985), and Dogville (2003) as well as BBC's Merlin (2008–2012).

Early life
Hurt was born John Vincent Hurt on 22 January 1940 in Chesterfield, Derbyshire, the son of Phyllis (née Massey; 1907–1975), an engineer and one-time actress, and Arnold Herbert Hurt (1904–1999), a mathematician who became a Church of England clergyman and served as vicar of Holy Trinity Church in Shirebrook, Derbyshire. His father was previously vicar of St John's parish in Sunderland, County Durham. In 1937, he moved his family to Derbyshire, where he became Perpetual Curate of Holy Trinity Church. When Hurt was five, his father became the vicar of St Stephen's Church in Woodville, Derbyshire, and remained there until 1953.

At the age of eight, Hurt was sent to the Anglican St Michael's Preparatory School in Otford, Kent, where he eventually developed his passion for acting. He decided he wanted to become an actor after his first role as a girl in a school production of The Blue Bird by Maurice Maeterlinck. Hurt stated that a senior master at the school would abuse him and others by removing his two false front teeth and putting his tongue in the boys' mouths, as well as rubbing their faces with his stubble, and that the experience affected him hugely. Hurt, aged 12, became a boarder at Lincoln School (then a grammar school) because he had failed the entrance examination for admission to his brother's school. His headmaster at Lincoln School laughed when Hurt told him he wanted to be an actor, telling him, "Well, you may be all right in school plays but you wouldn't stand a chance in the profession."

Hurt's father moved to St Aidan's Church in Cleethorpes, Lincolnshire. In a Guardian interview Hurt states the family lived in a vicarage opposite a cinema, but he was not allowed to go there, as films were "frowned upon." However, watching theatre was considered "fine" and encouraged particularly by his mother, who took him regularly to the repertory theatre in Cleethorpes. His parents disliked his later acting ambitions and encouraged him to become an art teacher instead. Aged 17, Hurt enrolled in Grimsby Art School (now the East Coast School of Art and Design), where he studied art. In 1959, he won a scholarship allowing him to study for an Art Teacher's Diploma at Saint Martin's School of Art in London. Despite the scholarship, paying his tuition fees and living expenses was difficult, so he persuaded some of his friends to pose naked and sold the portraits. In 1960, he won a scholarship to RADA, where he trained for two years.

Career

Hurt's first film was The Wild and the Willing (1962) and TV's Gideon's Way episode: The Tin God (1964) as prison escapee Freddy Tisdale, but his first major role was as Richard Rich in A Man for All Seasons (1966). He played Timothy Evans, who was hanged for murders committed by his landlord John Christie, in 10 Rillington Place (1971), earning him his first BAFTA nomination for Best Supporting Actor. His portrayal of Quentin Crisp in the TV play The Naked Civil Servant (1975) gave him prominence and earned him the British Academy Television Award for Best Actor.

The following year, Hurt appeared as Anthony John Grey, a crooked computer programming expert in The Sweeney episode Tomorrow Man. He won further acclaim for his bravura performance as the Roman emperor Caligula in the BBC drama serial I, Claudius. In a much later documentary about the series, I Claudius: A Television Epic (2002), Hurt revealed that he had originally declined the role when it was first offered to him, but that series director Herbert Wise had invited him to a special pre-production party, hoping Hurt would change his mind, and that he was so impressed by meeting the rest of the cast and crew that he reversed his decision and took the role.

Hurt appeared in the 1978 film Midnight Express, for which he won a Golden Globe and a BAFTA and was nominated for an Academy Award for Best Supporting Actor (the latter of which he lost to Christopher Walken for his performance in The Deer Hunter). Around the same time, he lent his voice to Ralph Bakshi's animated film adaptation of Lord of the Rings, playing the role of Aragorn. Hurt voiced Hazel, the heroic rabbit leader of his warren in the film adaptation of Watership Down (both 1978) and later played the major villain, General Woundwort, in the animated television series version. As the deformed Joseph Merrick in The Elephant Man (1980), he won another BAFTA and was nominated for a Golden Globe and an Academy Award for Best Actor.

His other roles in the 1970s and the beginning of the 1980s included Kane, the first victim of the title creature in the film Alien (1979, a role which he reprised as a parody in Spaceballs); would-be art school radical Scrawdyke in Little Malcolm (1974); and also had a starring role in Sam Peckinpah's critically panned but moderately successful final film, The Osterman Weekend (1983). Also in this period, he starred as the Fool opposite Laurence Olivier's King in King Lear (1983). Hurt also appeared as Raskolnikov in a BBC television adaptation of Crime and Punishment (1979).

Hurt voiced Snitter in The Plague Dogs, played  Winston Smith in the film adaptation of George Orwell's novel Nineteen Eighty-Four (1984) and starred in Disney's The Black Cauldron (1985), voicing the film's main antagonist, the Horned King. Hurt provided the voiceover for AIDS: Iceberg/Tombstone, a 1986 public information film warning of the dangers of AIDS, and played the title role, the on-screen narrator, in Jim Henson's television series The StoryTeller (1988). He had a supporting role as "Bird" O'Donnell in Jim Sheridan's film The Field (1990), which garnered him another BAFTA nomination and was cast as the reclusive tycoon S.R. Hadden in Contact (1997). During this time, Hurt provided narration on the British musical group Art of Noise's concept album The Seduction of Claude Debussy and narrated a four-part TV series The Universe (1999).

In the first Harry Potter film, Harry Potter and the Philosopher's Stone (2001), he played Mr Ollivander, the wand-maker. He returned for the adaptation of Harry Potter and the Goblet of Fire, though his scenes in that film were cut. He also returned for Harry Potter and the Deathly Hallows – Part 1 and Part 2. In the 2006 film V for Vendetta, he played the role of Adam Sutler, leader of the Norsefire fascist dictatorship and in Steven Spielberg's Indiana Jones and the Kingdom of the Crystal Skull (2008) he appeared as Harold Oxley.

He voiced the Great Dragon Kilgharrah, who aids the young warlock Merlin as he protects the future King Arthur, in the BBC television series Merlin (also 2008). In 2011, he narrated the BBC documentary, Planet Dinosaur, the first dinosaur-centred documentary completely shown through CGI.

More than thirty years after The Naked Civil Servant, Hurt reprised the role of Quentin Crisp in the 2009 film An Englishman in New York. This television film depicts Crisp's later years in New York. He returned to Orwell's Nineteen Eighty-Four, playing the on-screen Big Brother for the Paper Zoo Theatre Company's stage adaptation of the novel in June 2009. The theatre production premiered at the National Media Museum, in Bradford and toured during 2010. Hurt said, "I think Paper Zoo thought it would be quite ironic to have the person who played Winston having risen in the party. From the Chestnut Tree Cafe, he's managed to get his wits together again, now understanding that 2 and 2 make 5, and becomes Big Brother. So it tickled my fancy, and of course I looked up Paper Zoo, and they seem to me to be the sort of company that's essential in the country as we know it, and doing a lot of really good stuff."

At the 65th British Academy Film Awards Hurt won the award for Outstanding British Contribution to Cinema. In 2013, Hurt appeared in Doctor Who as a 'forgotten' incarnation of the Doctor, known as the War Doctor. His character first appears at the conclusion of the series seven finale "The Name of the Doctor"; his origins are given in the mini-episode "The Night of the Doctor";  he regenerates in the 50th anniversary episode "The Day of the Doctor", He reprised the role on audio for Big Finish Productions in a series of audio stories starting from 2015 to 2017, completing twelve episodes over four box sets. He also played the title character in an audio drama adaptation of The Invisible Man for the company, for which he was nominated for a BBC Audio Drama Award.

During Terry Gilliam's eighth attempt at making his development hell project The Man Who Killed Don Quixote, Hurt was set to star as Don Quixote alongside Adam Driver. However, his declining health and eventual death led the project to be cancelled yet again; he was eventually replaced by Jonathan Pryce.

Hurt was due to appear alongside Ben Kingsley in a film entitled Broken Dream, to be directed by Neil Jordan. In 2015, Hurt provided the voice of main antagonist Sailor John in the Thomas & Friends film Sodor's Legend of the Lost Treasure along with Eddie Redmayne (Ryan) and Jamie Campbell Bower (Skiff). At the time of his death he had completed filming That Good Night, in which he played a terminally ill writer. Hurt was initially cast as former British prime minister Neville Chamberlain in Darkest Hour. However, according to Gary Oldman, Hurt was undergoing treatment for pancreatic cancer, and was unable to attend the read-throughs; actor Ronald Pickup assumed the role of Chamberlain instead, and Hurt died from cancer in January 2017.

Personal life

Hurt had an older brother, Br. Anselm (born Michael), a Roman Catholic convert who became a monk and writer at Glenstal Abbey; Hurt had contributed to his brother's books. Hurt also had an adopted sister, Monica. In 1962, Hurt's father left his parish in Cleethorpes to become headmaster of St Michael's College in the Central American country of British Honduras. Hurt's mother died in 1975, and his father died in 1999 at the age of 95.

In 1962, Hurt married actress Annette Robertson. The marriage ended in 1964. In 1967, he began his longest relationship with Marie-Lise Volpeliere-Pierrot, a French model. The couple had planned to get married after 15 years together. On 26 January 1983, Hurt and Volpeliere-Pierrot went horseback riding early in the morning near their house in Ascott-under-Wychwood, Oxfordshire; Volpeliere-Pierrot was thrown off her horse. She went into a coma and died later that day.

In September 1984, Hurt married his old friend, Donna Peacock, an American actress, at a local Register Office. The couple moved to Kenya but divorced in January 1990.

On 24 January 1990, Hurt married Joan Dalton, an American production assistant, whom he had met while filming Scandal. With her, he had two sons. This marriage ended in 1996 and was followed by a seven-year relationship with Sarah Owens, a Dublin-born presenter and writer. The couple moved to County Wicklow, where they settled close to their friends, director John Boorman and Claddagh Records founder and Guinness heir Garech Browne. In July 2002, the couple separated. In March 2005, Hurt married his fourth wife, Anwen Rees-Meyers, an advertising film producer. He gave up smoking and drinking during his fourth marriage. He lived in Cromer, Norfolk.

In 2007, Hurt took part in the BBC genealogical television series Who Do You Think You Are?, which investigated part of his family history. Prior to the programme, Hurt had harboured a love of Ireland and was enamoured of a "deeply beguiling" family legend that suggested his great-grandmother had been the illegitimate daughter of a Marquess of Sligo. The genealogical evidence uncovered seemed to contradict the family legend, rendering the suggestion doubtful. The search revealed that his great-grandmother had previously lived in Grimsby, at a location within a mile of the art college at which Hurt had been a student.

In 2016, Hurt announced he was in favour of the United Kingdom voting to remain in the EU.

Illness and death 
On 16 June 2015, Hurt publicly announced that he had been diagnosed with early-stage pancreatic cancer. He confirmed that he would continue to work while undergoing treatment and said that both he and the medical team treating him were "more than optimistic about a satisfactory outcome." Following treatment, he stated that his cancer was in remission on 12 October 2015. He died at his home in Cromer, Norfolk, on 25 January 2017, three days after his 77th birthday.

Awards and honours

Honours

In 2004, Hurt was made a Commander of the Order of the British Empire (CBE). He was created a Knight Bachelor in the 2015 New Year Honours for services to drama. On 17 July 2015, he attended an investiture ceremony at Windsor Castle where he received the accolade from Queen Elizabeth II.

In 2012, he was among the British cultural icons selected by artist Sir Peter Blake to appear in a new version of his album cover for the Beatles' Sgt. Pepper's Lonely Hearts Club Band, to celebrate the British cultural figures of his life that he most admired.

In 2014, he received the Will Award, presented by the Shakespeare Theatre Company, along with Stacy Keach and Dame Diana Rigg.

Charity patron

Since 2003, Hurt was a patron of the Proteus Syndrome Foundation, both in the United Kingdom and in the US. Proteus syndrome is the condition that Joseph Merrick, who Hurt played (renamed as John Merrick) in The Elephant Man, is thought to have suffered from, although Merrick's exact condition is still not known with certainty.

From 2006, Hurt had been a patron of Project Harar, a UK-based charity working in Ethiopia for children with facial disfigurements. Hurt was announced as patron of Norwich Cinema City in March 2013.

In 2014, Hurt designed a Paddington Bear statue which was placed outside the British Museum. It was one of fifty statues of Paddington located around London prior to the release of the film Paddington which were auctioned to raise funds for the National Society for the Prevention of Cruelty to Children (NSPCC).

University degrees and appointments

In January 2002, Hurt received an honorary degree from the University of Derby. In January 2006 he received an honorary degree of Doctor of Letters from the University of Hull. In 2012 he was appointed provost of Norwich University College of the Arts, and became its first chancellor when the college became a full university in 2013. On 23 January 2013, he was given an Honorary Doctor of Arts by the University of Lincoln, at Lincoln Cathedral.

References

External links 

 
 
 
 
 Sir John Hurt Film Trust

1940 births
2017 deaths
20th-century English male actors
21st-century English male actors
Alumni of Saint Martin's School of Art
Alumni of RADA
BAFTA Outstanding British Contribution to Cinema Award
Best Actor BAFTA Award winners
Best Supporting Actor BAFTA Award winners
Best Actor BAFTA Award (television) winners
Best Supporting Actor Golden Globe (film) winners
People educated at St Michael's Preparatory School, Otford
People associated with Norwich University of the Arts
Commanders of the Order of the British Empire
Actors awarded knighthoods
Deaths from pancreatic cancer
Deaths from cancer in England
Knights Bachelor
English male film actors
English male Shakespearean actors
English male stage actors
English male television actors
English male voice actors
English Anglicans
Male actors from Derbyshire
Audiobook narrators
People from Shirebrook
People educated at Lincoln Grammar School